Neukirchen (North Frisian: Naischöspel) is a municipality in the district of Nordfriesland, in Schleswig-Holstein, Germany.

Notable people
In 1927, expressionist painter and printmaker Emil Nolde designed his house Seebüll in Neukirchen, where he lived to his death.

References

Municipalities in Schleswig-Holstein
Nordfriesland